The Party of Popular Movement (PMP) was a political party of French Somaliland and the French Territory of the Afars and the Issas.

History
It was created in 1958 by Somali nationalist militants. Its candidate Moussa Ahmed Idriss was elected deputy of the territory to the French National Assembly in 1962. He sat on the benches of the Union for the New Republic (UNR), the Gaullist party. Its leaders were Obsieh Bouh Abdallah (born in 1932) and Ahmad Farah Dalieh. In 1963, the PMP allied with Ali Aref with which it won the territorial elections. Its leaders signed the agreement of Arta. In 1965, the PMP was joined by activists of the Democratic Union Issa led by Hassan Gouled Aptidon. With the Democratic Union Afar, PMP involved itself in the organization of nationalist demonstrations in Djibouti in August 1966 to mark the passing of General de Gaulle. The formations then split. The PMP called for a vote of "no", i.e. in favor of independence, in the referendum of March 1967. Its ministers then left the government. Consequently, on July 13, 1967, the PMP was dissolved by decision of the administrative authorities of the territory. One of its militants, Omar Osman Rabeh, was sentenced to death (later commuted to life in prison) for the attempted murder of Ali Aref Bourhan in 1968. He was eventually traded against France's ambassador to Somalia, who was kidnapped in Mogadishu by a commando the Liberation Front of the Somali Coast (FLCS) in 1975.

The party was dissolved in the early- to mid-1970s.

References 
Oberle (Philippe), Hugot (Pierre) [1985] History of Djibouti - Origins to the Republic, Paris, Dakar, Presence Africaine (repr. 1996), 346 p.
Ali Coubba [1998] Ahmed Dini and politics in Djibouti, Paris, L'Harmattan, 235 p.

Horn of Africa
History of Djibouti
Defunct political parties in Djibouti
Democratic socialist parties in Africa
French Territory of the Afars and the Issas
Socialism in Djibouti